This painting, also commonly known as The Berlin Tondo, is a desco da parto, or birth tray, painted by the Italian Renaissance artist Masaccio, c. 1427–1428, though the work is regarded as from his workshop or by a follower by many recent scholars. It is considered by some art historians to be the Renaissance's first tondo - or circular work of art. The work is 56cm in diameter and features a nativity scene on the front and a young child playing with small dog on the back. 

While the birth of Jesus, and that of his mother, were very common scenes in religious art, and often used contemporary settings and costumes,  actual depictions of a contemporary childbirth were very rare.

References
 

Paintings by Masaccio
1428 paintings